The Cleiman Mound and Village Site is a prehistoric archaeological site located near the Mississippi River in Jackson County, Illinois. The site includes an intact burial mound and the remains of a village site. The village was inhabited by a number of prehistoric cultures during the Archaic, Woodland, and Mississippian periods; settlement at the site began prior to 400 B.C. and lasted through 1300 A.D. The mound was built during the Middle Woodland Period by Hopewellian peoples and is likely the only Hopewell mound in the Mississippi Valley in Southern Illinois.

The site was added to the National Register of Historic Places on October 18, 1977.

References

Archaeological sites on the National Register of Historic Places in Illinois
Geography of Jackson County, Illinois
Hopewellian peoples
Mounds in Illinois
National Register of Historic Places in Jackson County, Illinois